The Western India Automobile Association (WIAA) was founded in 1919 and is one of the largest motoring organisations in Asia with over 42,000 members. The head office is located in Mumbai with branches in Ahmedabad, Pune, Nagpur, Jaipur and Goa.

The association has reciprocal service arrangements with automobile associations and clubs all over the world.

The association is empowered under the Motor Vehicles Act and Rules to:
 undertake driving tests for the issue of Driver's Licenses for cars and two- wheelers.
 issue International Driving Permits for members traveling abroad.

The association is also represented on various Central and State Government bodies, including the State Road Safety Councils and Accident Prevention Committees.

It periodically organizes courses and camps on road safety, advanced driving and car pollution for the benefit of motorists in general.

Conducts Vintage and Classic Cars/Bikes Rallies.

Empowering Women drivers round the globe.

Notes

External links
 Official WIAA Website
 Automobile Associations in India

Financial services companies established in 1919
Automobile associations
Organisations based in Mumbai
1919 establishments in India
Clubs and societies in India